Peetzsee is a lake in Landkreis Oder-Spree, Brandenburg, Germany. It is in the municipality of Grünheide, not far from Berlin.

External links 
 

Lakes of Brandenburg
Oder-Spree
Federal waterways in Germany